Linick is a surname. Notable people with the surname include:

Anthony Linick (born 1938), American educator and author
Steve Linick (born 1963), former American Inspector General of the Department of State